Narenjak (also Romanized as Nārenjak; also known as Nīrīnjeh) is a village in Chaharduli-ye Sharqi Rural District, Chaharduli District, Qorveh County, Kurdistan Province, Iran. At the 2006 census, its population was 961, in 232 families.

Language 
Linguistic composition of the city:

References 

Towns and villages in Qorveh County

Kurdish settlements in Kurdistan Province